Taj al-Mulouk Khanoum Umm al-Khakan (died 1909) was the royal consort of shah Mozaffar ad-Din Shah Qajar (r. 1896–1907). 

She was the daughter of Mizra Muhammad Taqui Khan-e Farahani and princess Ezzat Al Dawla Malikzada Khanoum and niece of shah Naser al-Din Shah Qajar (r. 1848–1896). She was the mother of shah Mohammad Ali Shah Qajar.

References

Qajar royal consorts
19th-century Iranian women
1909 deaths